The Cavalry Staff Corps (also known as the Staff Corps of Cavalry or Staff Dragoons) was a unit formed during the Napoleonic Wars to keep discipline in the British Army. Consisting of four troops of cavalry, the corps was first raised in 1813 during the Peninsular War to deal with an excess of criminality and desertion in the Duke of Wellington's armies. It was disbanded after that campaign ended in 1814 but was reformed in 1815 during the Hundred Days campaign. The corps also served in the subsequent occupation of France. The unit was Britain's first standing military police force. A successor unit was raised for service in the Crimean War of 1853–1856 and a permanent military police was established in 1877.

Background 
By 1813 the Duke of Wellington's army had been engaged in the Peninsular War, fighting the French Emperor Napoleon's armies in Portugal and Spain, for more than five years and was noted to be suffering from higher levels of desertion and criminality than the rest of the British Army.  In January 1813 the Duke of York, commander in chief of the British Army, wrote to Earl Bathurst, the Secretary of State for War and the Colonies to propose the formation of a new corps to help keep discipline.  This corps, known variously as the Cavalry Staff Corps, Staff Corps of Cavalry or Staff Dragoons, was formally constituted by the Prince Regent in April 1813.  The unit is regarded as Britain's first standing military police force and is acknowledged as the forerunner to the modern-day Royal Military Police.

Formation and service in the Peninsula 
One troop of the corps was raised in Great Britain, one in Ireland and two from the army in Spain.  The men were selected, on the basis of their previous good character, from volunteers from several regiments. The troop raised in Great Britain comprised 76 men from the 2nd and 7th Dragoon Guards, the 2nd Dragoons and the 7th Light Dragoons.  The troop raised in Ireland was of 68 men from the 1st and 6th Dragoon Guards, the 6th Dragoons and the 13th Light Dragoons.  The two troops formed in Spain combined numbered four captains, four lieutenants, two cornets, six sergeants, six corporals and 120 privates, taken from cavalry regiments already in the theatre.  The enlisted men of the corps received extra pay: sergeants got an extra shilling (12 pence) a day, corporals 8 pence and privates 6 pence.  The unit ranked in precedence after the cavalry but before the Foot Guards.  Being formed under the authority of the commander-in-chief of the British Army, the Cavalry Staff Corps had jurisdiction over the infantry and cavalry only.  Responsibility for the discipline of the engineers and artillery  lay with the Master-General of the Ordnance.

The Cavalry Staff Corps in Spain was formed at Fresneda de la Sierra Tirón and placed under the command of a "major commandant", Lieutenant-Colonel Sir George Scovell of the 57th Foot.  The men were initially mounted on their own horses from their previous regiment until the corps received its own horses, shipped from England.  Scovell's orders stated that the unit was to be employed for duties similar to those carried out by the French Marechaussee (a gendarme unit) and to carry out "the duties of the police of the army, and in others of a confidential nature".  The unit also provided orderlies to Wellington's staff, patrolled the line of march, guarded supply depots and prevented soldiers from entering towns and cities.  Detachments of the Cavalry Staff Corps were allocated to each division.

Despite its intended purpose, the Cavalry Staff Corps were employed on reconnaissance duties in the lead up to the 21 June 1813 Battle of Vitoria.  After the conclusion of the Siege of Pamplona in October 1813 Wellington sent the unit to scour nearby villages to look for 12,500 of his men who had failed to report for duty after the storming of the town and were presumed to have deserted.  The corps was disbanded on 25 September 1814, following the defeat of France and the signing of the Treaty of Paris.

Uniform 
When first formed no official uniform was available and Staff Corps members instead wore their previous uniforms with a red scarf tied around their right shoulder as a distinguishing mark.  It had originally been proposed that the corps should wear the uniform of the Royal Staff Corps (a similarly organised engineering unit) but with bearskin hats, a feature that would make them easily distinguishable from line cavalry.  However, the corps was eventually issued its own uniform which drew elements from other cavalry units.  The jackets were red – similar to those worn by the Dragoon Guards; whilst the blue plastron, striped girdle and overalls, with double stripes on the legs, were similar to those worn by Light Dragoons. The corps wore the light cavalry shako with a unique all-red plume. All piping and cords were in white which was meant to reflect the non-combatant nature of the force.  The saddle roll was marked with SD (for "Staff Dragoons") and with the letter of the man's troop. The enlisted men were armed with cavalry carbines.

Waterloo campaign 
Wellington reformed the corps after Napoleon returned from exile in 1815 and it served with his army in the Waterloo campaign.  Three men were taken from each cavalry regiment, including those of Britain's allies, that were under Wellington's command and combined into a unit of two troops.  The men were granted additional pay of one franc per day. Scovell commanded the unit and was requested to bring former officers of the corps over from Britain.  These officer's commissions were dated 10 August 1815, though the campaign had ended the previous month with the restoration of the Bourbon king Louis XVIII to his throne in Paris.  The two troops accompanied Wellington's army on the march to Paris and a further two troops were raised to serve during the subsequent occupation of France.  As well as policing duties the corps was responsible for making compensation payments to French citizens affected by the army of occupation.  They distributed 19,000 francs to the inhabitants of Fontaine-Notre-Dame after a fire, originating in a British Army forge, destroyed 20 houses on 25 April 1816.  The Cavalry Staff Corps acted as part of the "enemy" force during wargames of the allied armies near Valenciennes in the autumn of 1818.

The allied occupation forces were withdrawn from October 1818 and the British element returned to France by the end of November.  The Cavalry Staff Corps was disbanded for the second time on 24 December 1818.

Legacy 
During the Crimean War the concept of a mounted staff corps to maintain discipline, on a similar basis to the Cavalry Staff Corps, was revived.  The Mounted Staff Corps was formed in 1854 and served with the British Army in that theatre until disbanded in October 1855.  The men were recruited largely from the Irish Constabulary and were used to protect supplies being unloaded at dockyards, among other duties. The members of the corps wore a uniform reminiscent of the Cavalry Staff Corps: red tunics with hussar braid and blue facings; double striped black overalls and a plumed, police-style helmet.

After the Crimean campaign the British Army continued to use mounted troops as police, but on an ad-hoc basis.  A formal unit, the Military Mounted Police was established in 1877 and supplemented by the Military Foot Police in 1882.  These units are the direct antecedents of the modern Royal Military Police.

Notes

References 

British administrative corps
Military police agencies of the United Kingdom
Military provosts
1813 establishments in the United Kingdom
1814 disestablishments in the United Kingdom
1815 establishments in the United Kingdom
1818 disestablishments in the United Kingdom